= InSatDb =

Content
- Description: microsatellites of fully sequenced insect genomes.
- Organisms: insects

Contact
- Primary citation: PMID 17082205
- Release date: 2006

Access
- Website: http://www.cdfd.org.in/insatdb
- Download URL: download query based

InSatDb is a database of microsatellites of sequenced insect genomes.

== See also ==
- MICdb
- microsatellite
