= MICdb =

Content
- Description: prokaryotic microsatellites.
- Organisms: prokaryotes

Contact
- Primary citation: Vattipally B Sreenu (2003) & al.

Access
- Website: http://www.cdfd.org.in/micas

MICdb (Microsatellites database) is a database of non-redundant microsatellites from prokaryotic genomes.

Following the release of MICdb in 2003, the database has been updated to MICdb 3.0 as of 2014. Version 3.0 of the database contains information for 4,772 baterial and 271 archeal genomes.

The MICAS (Microsatellite Analysis Server) webserver is based on the MICdb database and integrates the use of MICdb with other tools for finding microsatellites and designing primers.

== See also ==
- InSatDb
- Microsatellite
